Red River Broadcasting is a television broadcasting company based in Fargo, North Dakota. It operates Fox affiliates in the Fargo, North Dakota and Duluth, Minnesota–Superior, Wisconsin television markets.

Curtis Squire, Inc., a holding company in Eden Prairie, Minnesota, owns 100% of Red River Broadcasting. The company, which formerly owned Regis Corporation, is owned by Anita, Bill, David, Drew, and James Kunin. Kathy Lau is the COO.

In addition to television stations, Red River Broadcasting once operated radio stations through a sister company named Red Rock Radio. At its height, Red Rock Radio owned a total of 25 stations in Minnesota and Wisconsin. However, following the death of Myron Kunin in 2013, his surviving family members decided to liquidate his broadcasting assets and sold the stations to various buyers.

Current properties

Former properties

Television

Radio

Minnesota	 
 KQDS, Duluth (now KJOQ)
 KQDS-FM, Duluth
 KAOD, Babbitt (simulcast KQDS-FM, now KZJZ)
 KBAJ, Deer River (simulcast KQDS-FM)
 WXXZ, Grand Marais (simulcast KQDS-FM, now WFNX)
 WWAX, Hermantown  (now WWPE-FM)
 KZIO, Two Harbors
 KGHS, International Falls
 KSDM, International Falls
 KGPZ, Coleraine (now WDKE)
 KRBT, Eveleth
 WEVE-FM, Eveleth
 KFGI, Crosby 
 KLKS, Breezy Point
 WWWI, Baxter
 WWWI-FM, Pillager 
 KKIN, Aitkin
 KKIN-FM, Aitkin
 WCMP, Pine City
 WCMP-FM, Pine City

Wisconsin
 WLMX-FM, Balsam Lake (now WZEZ)
 WXCX, Siren
 WHSM, Hayward (now WBZH)
 WHSM-FM, Hayward
 WXCE, Amery

References

Companies based in Fargo–Moorhead
Television broadcasting companies of the United States